Star Trek: The Next Generation is an American science fiction television program that originally aired from September 1987 to May 1994. It won and was nominated for a variety of awards, including seven Emmy Award nominations for the first season, and a further eight in its second season. It would go on to be nominated a total of 58 times, of which it won a total of nineteen awards. Only one of these nominations was not for a Creative Arts Emmy, which was the nomination for Outstanding Drama Series for the show's seventh season.

Cast member Wil Wheaton was nominated on three occasions for a Youth in Film Award, which he won in 1989. Further nominations were received by guest actors Kimberly Cullum and Gabriel Damon at the 16th Youth in Film Awards in 1995. The only other nomination for a single actor was the Screen Actors Guild Award received by Patrick Stewart for Outstanding Performance by a Male Actor in a Drama Series in the award's inaugural session in 1995.

As of January 1, 2013, Star Trek: The Next Generation has been nominated for 85 different awards, of which it has won 31. Despite the series ending in 1994, it has continued to win awards in special recognition of the series, and for the DVD releases. In this list, "year" refers to the year the award was presented to the winner.

ASCAP Film and Television Music Awards

BSFA Awards
The British Science Fiction Association Awards have been awarded since 1970 by the British Science Fiction Association. Star Trek: The Next Generation was nominated on two occasions for Best Dramatic Presentation.

Cinema Audio Society Awards
The Cinema Audio Society Awards were first handed out in 1994. Star Trek: The Next Generation was nominated twice in the first two years, winning on one occasion.

Emmy Awards
The Emmy is a television production award considered the television equivalent to the Academy Award. Star Trek: The Next Generation was nominated for a single Primetime Emmy Award, and a further 57 Creative Arts Emmys, of which it won nineteen.

Primetime Emmy Awards

Creative Arts Emmy Awards

Hugo Awards
The Hugo Awards were first awarded in 1952, and were named the Science Fiction Achievement Awards until 1992. Episodes of The Next Generation were nominated on three occasions, winning twice.

Saturn Awards
Awarded since 1972, the Saturn Awards is an annual accolade presented by the Academy of Science Fiction, Fantasy & Horror Films to honor science fiction and fantasy films and television shows. Star Trek: The Next Generation has been nominated for seven awards, and won three of them. It was also awarded a Special Recognition Award for the work of all the Star Trek television series in 2005, and further awards for releases of the first five seasons on Blu-ray.

Youth in Film Awards
The first Youth in Film Awards were awarded in 1979. Cast member Wil Wheaton was nominated on three occasions and won once. Two further nominations were received in 1995 for guest actors Kimberly Cullum and Gabriel Damon.

Other awards
Star Trek: The Next Generation was awarded a Peabody Award for the episode "The Big Goodbye". The Peabody Board saw the series as a new standard in syndicated television, and set forth a challenge to the broadcast industry to produce other shows in syndication of the same quality.

See also
List of Star Trek: The Original Series awards and nominations
List of Star Trek: Deep Space Nine awards and nominations
List of Star Trek: Voyager awards and nominations
List of Star Trek: Enterprise awards and nominations
List of Star Trek: Discovery awards and nominations

References

External links
 Awards for Star Trek: The Next Generation at IMDb

Next
Awards